Baghai  is a town and commune in Khenchela Province, Algeria. It is located at 35°30'59.99"N 7°06'60.00" E. According to the 1998 census it has a population of 6,414.

Geography
Baghai is located between the Aurès mountains in the south and the Garaat al-Tarf salt lake in the north.  El Hamma, Khenchela is 4½ km away and 7 km to the south is Khenchela, capital of Khenchela Province.

History
In antiquity Baghai was known as Bagai, and was a city of Roman North Africa.

References

Communes of Khenchela Province